The 2019 New Zealand Derby was a horse race which took place at Ellerslie Racecourse on Saturday 2 March 2019. It was the 144th running of the New Zealand Derby, and it was won by Crown Prosecutor. With a dividend of $105.40 for a $1 win bet, it is considered the biggest upset in Derby history.

Crown Prosecutor was bred by Hesket Bloodstock in Victoria, Australia and was bought for A$50,000 at the Inglis Melbourne Premier Yearling Sale. He is owned by Huntingdale Lodge 2012 Ltd (managed by Harvey Green) and JML Bloodstock Ltd (Lib Petagna) and is trained by Stephen Marsh in Cambridge.

Although he had won the Wellington Stakes at Group Three level in November, Crown Prosecutor had been disappointing in two subsequent starts and had the highest odds in the 18-horse Derby field.

Ridden by Craig Grylls, Crown Prosecutor raced fiercely in the early stages of the race but settled into a good position trailing the leaders. He was travelling smoothly approaching the home turn and quickened to take the lead in the straight. In A Twinkling, who had a wide run throughout the race, nevertheless provided a stern challenge in the last 200 metres. But Crown Prosecutor refused to let him pass and held him out by a head. It was a first New Zealand Derby victory for Marsh and Grylls. Marsh had two runners in the race, with ninth-placed Vernanme considered the better chance as third favourite.

It was another near-miss for In A Twinkling's trainer Jamie Richards and owners Te Akau Racing. Since winning the race in 2017 with Gingernuts), they have finished second two years in a row. Mongolianconqueror was beaten by a nose by Vin De Dance in 2018.

Race details
 Sponsor: Vodafone New Zealand
 Prize money: NZ$1,000,000
 Track: Good
 Number of runners: 18
 Winner's time: 2:28.17

Full result

Winner's details
Further details of the winner, Crown Prosecutor:

 Foaled: 19 September 2015
 Sire: Medaglia d'Oro; 
 Dam: Riptide (Exceed And Excel)
 Owner: Huntingdale Lodge 2012 Ltd (Mgr: Harvey Green) & JML Bloodstock Ltd (Mgr: L Petagna)
 Trainer: Stephen Marsh
 Breeder: Hesket Bloodstock
 Starts: 7
 Wins: 2
 Seconds: 0
 Thirds: 2
 Earnings: $644,625

The road to the Derby
Early-season appearances in 2018-19 prior to running in the Derby.

 Crown Prosecutor – 3rd Wellington Stakes, 8th Levin Classic, 9th Waikato Guineas
 In A Twinkling – 4th New Zealand 2000 Guineas, 7th Uncle Remus Stakes, 13th Karaka Million 3YO Classic, 2nd Avondale Guineas
 Platinum Invador – 9th Avondale Guineas
 Arrogant – 9th Sarten Memorial, 7th Auckland Guineas, 6th Levin Classic, 2nd Waikato Guineas
 Surely Sacred – 2nd Bonecrusher Stakes, 1st Auckland Guineas, 5th Karaka Million 3YO Classic, 1st Avondale Guineas
 Bobby Dee – 10th Trevor Eagle Memorial, 6th Auckland Salver, 4th Avondale Guineas
 Tolemac – 4th Geelong Classic, 14th Victoria Derby, 8th Auckland Guineas, 14th Avondale Guineas
 Prise De Fer – 6th Karaka Million 3YO Classic, 5th Avondale Guineas
 Vernanme – 5th Uncle Remus Stakes, 2nd Levin Classic, 3rd Avondale Guineas
 Cutadeel – 1st Auckland Salver, 13th Avondale Guineas
 The Chosen One – 1st Zacinto Stakes, 11th New Zealand 2000 Guineas, 4th Waikato Guineas, 7th Avondale Guineas
 Swords Drawn – 2nd Wellington Stakes, 3rd Auckland Salver, 14th Karaka Million 3YO Classic, 11th Avondale Guineas
 Sir Nate – 7th Hawke's Bay Guineas, 3rd New Zealand 2000 Guineas, 10th Karaka Million 3YO Classic, 6th Avondale Guineas
 Botti – 4th Wanganui Guineas, 11th Moonee Valley Vase, 12th Avondale Guineas
 Sponge Bob – 1st Waikato Guineas
 More Wonder – 5th New Zealand 2000 Guineas, 4th Auckland Guineas, 4th Levin Classic, 5th Thorndon Mile, 4th Haunui Farm WFA Classic
 Lincoln Falls – 4th Uncle Remus Stakes, 5th Levin Classic, 5th Waikato Guineas

Subsequent performances

Crown Prosecutor was only 9th in the Rosehill Guineas and its best subsequent performance was 3rd behind Melody Belle in the Group 1 2019 Livamol Classic (2040m)

Runner up in the New Zealand Derby, In A Twinkling who followed up with 5th in both the Tulloch Stakes and Australian Derby behind Angel of Truth won the Group 3 Counties Cup (2100m) in 2019 and 2020 and was 3rd in the 2020 Zabeel Classic.

3rd placed Platinum Invader was behind In A Twinking in the same Australian starts but was later to achieve:

 1st in the Group 3 2020 City of Auckland Cup (2400m).
 2nd in the 2019 Manawatu Cup, Group 2 2020 Avondale Cup (2400m) and 2021 City of Auckland Cup.
 3rd in the 2019 Wanganui Cup, Group 1 2020 Auckland Cup and Group 2 2020 Herbert Power Stakes (2400m).

4th placed Arrogant was 2nd in the Rosehill Guineas behind The Autumn Sun but could only manage 9th in the Australian Derby.

5th placed Surely Sacred put on two worthy performances to be 4th in the Rosehill Guineas and 3rd in the Australian Derby.

8th placed Prise De Fer did not go to Australia but after a spell had 5 consecutive wins including the Group 2 2020 Rich Hill Mile (1600m) and Group 3 2020 Taranaki Cup (1800m) before a 2nd in the Otaki-Maori Weight for Age. It continued to be competitive in Group company.

Although only 11th in the New Zealand Derby, The Chosen One went on to compete with distinction at the very highest level including:

 1st in the Group 1 2022 Thorndon Mile, Group 2 2019 Herbert Power Stakes, Group 3 2019 Frank Packer Plate at Randwick, and Group 3 Manawatu Classic at Awapuni. 
 2nd in the 2021 Herbie Dyke Stakes and 2020 Sydney Cup.
 3rd in the 2020 Caulfield Cup and 2020 Otaki-Maori Weight for Age.
 4th in the 2020 Melbourne Cup and 2019 Australian Derby.

See also

 2020 New Zealand Derby
 2018 New Zealand Derby
 2017 New Zealand Derby
 2016 New Zealand Derby
 2015 New Zealand Derby
 2014 New Zealand Derby
 2013 New Zealand Derby
 2012 New Zealand Derby
 2011 New Zealand Derby
 2010 New Zealand Derby
  Recent winners of major NZ 3 year old races
 Desert Gold Stakes
 Hawke's Bay Guineas
 Karaka Million
 Levin Classic
 New Zealand 1000 Guineas
 New Zealand 2000 Guineas
 New Zealand Oaks

References

New Zealand Derby
New Zealand Derby
New Zealand Derby